Goran Ivanišević was the defending champion but did not compete that year.

Pete Sampras won in the final 6–3, 7–6(7–3), 6–1 against Karol Kučera.

Seeds

  Pete Sampras (champion)
  Patrick Rafter (quarterfinals)
  Carlos Moyà (first round)
  Petr Korda (second round)
  Karol Kučera (final)
  Richard Krajicek (second round)
  Yevgeny Kafelnikov (first round)
  Tim Henman (quarterfinals)

Draw

Final

Section 1

Section 2

External links
 1998 CA-TennisTrophy draw

Singles